Institut Pasteur du Cambodge (IPC) is a medical research centre and public health institute in Phnom Penh, Cambodia. It is part of the Pasteur Institute's international network of health centres and is partnered with the Ministry of Health. It was first established in 1953 and reopened in 1992 after the 1991 Paris Peace Agreements.

Since 1998, IPC has been the only source of post-exposure prophylaxis vaccinations in the prevention of rabies in Cambodia. The Institute has rabies prevention centres in Phnom Penh, Battambang and Kampong Cham.

From 2020, IPC has been part of the national committee involved in the public health response to the COVID-19 pandemic in Cambodia as well as conducting research into SARS-CoV-2. Researchers at IPC found through sequencing research that viruses from Cambodian horseshoe bats shared 97% similarity with SARS-CoV-2, providing knowledge into possible origins of COVID-19. IPC also conduct research on future emerging zoonoses.

See also 
 Health in Cambodia

References

External links 
 http://www.pasteur-kh.org/ 

Cambodge
COVID-19 pandemic in Cambodia
Virology institutes
Medical and health organisations based in Cambodia
Organisations based in Phnom Penh
Research institutes in Cambodia